Stemmatophora robustus is a species of snout moth in the genus Stemmatophora. It was described by Jan Asselbergs in 2010 as Acteniopsis robustus and is known from the United Arab Emirates.

References

Moths described in 2010
Pyralinae
Moths of Asia